The rolmo is a horizontal ritual cymbal used by Tibetan monks in Buddhist rites.  It has a broad central boss and is struck vertically, in contrast to the Silnyen.

See also 

 Buddhist music
 Tibetan music

References

Cymbals
Tibetan musical instruments